Three Hearts Marathon is a marathon, organised in Radenci in Slovenia. It has been taking place since 1981 and attracts several thousand people each year. In addition to the marathon, a half marathon (21 km), recreative running (10 km) and a course for juniors and teenagers are organised.

The event was the Slovenian national championships race from 1992 to 1998 and has hosted the national race in even-numbered years since then, now sharing the honour with the Ljubljana Marathon.

The 2020 edition of the race was postponed to 2021.05.15 due to the coronavirus pandemic, with registrants having the option of obtaining a refund.

Winners 
Key:

Statistics
Note: Marathon statistics only

Winners by country

References

List of winners
Juraj Gasparovic & Klaas Loonstra (2010-09-09). Three Hearts Marathon. Association of Road Racing Statisticians. Retrieved on 2011-04-23.

External links 
Three Hearts Marathon homepage

Marathons in Slovenia
Recurring sporting events established in 1981
1981 establishments in Yugoslavia
Spring (season) events in Slovenia